This is a list of Slavic peoples and Slavic tribes reported in Late Antiquity and in the Middle Ages, that is, before the year AD 1500.

Ancestors

Proto-Indo-Europeans (Proto-Indo-European speakers)
Proto-Balto-Slavs (common ancestors of Balts and Slavs) (Proto-Balto-Slavic speakers)
Proto-Slavs (Proto-Slavic speakers)

Antiquity

 Veneti / Sporoi (common ancestors of all Slavs, Proto-Slavs, and the West Slavs with the same name). It is hypothesized that Proto-Slavs had their origin in western Ukraine - west of the Dnieper, east of the Vistula, south of the Pripyat Marshes and north of the Carpathian Mountains and the Dniester, to the northwest of the Pontic Eurasian Steppes and south of the Baltic peoples, especially West Baltic peoples, with whom they have common ancestors, the Balto-Slavs. Proto-Slavs are mainly associated with Zarubintsy culture that had possible links to the ancient peoples of the Vistula basin (Przeworsk culture). Proto and Early Slavs, who were closely related to the Balts, were more influenced by the ancient Celts (La Tène culture) and by the Scythians and Sarmatians (Western Eurasian Steppe Iranian peoples from the northeast group who were nomads or seminomads). According to Marija Gimbutas, the people named "Scythian Farmers", mentioned by Herodotus, were the Proto-Slavs or Early Slavs, who bordered and lived south of the Balts, and not Scythians.
 Antes (ancestors of the East Slavs; some were also the ancestors of part of West Slavs and South Slavs)
 Veneti (ancestors of the West Slavs; some were also the ancestors of part of East Slavs and South Slavs)
 Sclaveni (ancestors of the South Slavs)

Middle Ages

East Slavs

 Antes (common ancestors of the East Slavs; some were also the ancestors of part of West Slavs and South Slavs) 
 Western-Northern groups
 Western Russian group / Western Ruthenian group / Western Old East Slavs ("Russians" or "Russian group" in the broad sense means Old East Slavic peoples, the common group from where modern ethnic groups or peoples of the Rusinians, Ukrainians, Belarusians and Russians descend and not only Russians in the narrow sense)
 Southwestern group (roughly in a large part of the hypothesized region of Proto-Slavs origin)
 Dulebes (Dulebi), ancestors of Ukrainians and Belarusians and part of Czechs. Assimilated into several East Slavic tribes or were the ancestors of them: the Volhynians, Drevlians, Polans, Dregoviches, and possibly Buzhans, eventually to become part of the Kievan Rus'.
 Buzhans / Bugans (Bugane > Buzhane; [g] > [ʒ]; zh = [ʒ]) (in the regions of the Southern Bug and Western Bug rivers)
 Southern Bug Buzhans (Southern Bug Slavs) (Buzhane), ancestors of Ukrainians and Russians
 Western Bug Buzhans (Western Bug Slavs) / Volhynians (Volynyane), ancestors of Ukrainians and part of Czechs
 Dregoviches / Dregovichians (Dregovichi), same with Draguvites, ancestors of Belarusians 
 Drevlyans (Drevlyane), ancestors of Ukrainians and Belarusians
 Polans (eastern) (Polyane), ancestors of Ukrainians, in Dnieper right (western) bank, Kyiv region.
 Teverians (Tivertsi / Tyvertsi) / Stadici / Stadichi (Stadychi)?, ancestors of Ukrainians and part of Moldovans and Romanians
 Khorvaty, in Prykarpattia and Zakarpattia, ancestors of Rusyns, Ukrainians, and Croats
 Southern group
 Don Slavs
 Ulichians (Ulichi), ancestors of Ukrainians, and part of Romanians (especially Moldovans)
 Central group
 Radimichians / Radimichs (Radimichi), ancestors of Belarusians and part of Russians 
 Severians (Severyane), ancestors of Ukrainians, Russians and part of Slavic Bulgarians
 Old Russian group / Northern Russian group / Northern Ruthenian group / Northern Old East Slavs
 Northeastern group (Krivichian-Vyatichian group) (Krivichians and Vyatichians had a relevant part in the formation of Proto-Russians)
 Krivichians (Krivichi), ancestors of Belarusians and Russians (Kievan Rus' Principalities roughly corresponded to older tribal lands)
 Polochans (Polochane) / Polotskian Krivichians, in Polotsk Land (Polotskaya Zemlya) (later Polotsk Principality), ancestors of Belarusians
 Pskovians / Pskovian Krivichians, in Pskov Land (Pskovskaya Zemlya), ancestors of Russians
 Smolenians / Smolenian Krivichians, in Smolensk Land (Smolenskaya Zemlya) (later Smolensk Principality), ancestors of Russians
 Tverians / Tverian Krivichians, in Tver Land (Tver'skaya Zemlya) (later Tver Principality), ancestors of Russians
 Zalessians / Zalessian Krivichians, in Zalessa Land or Zalesye (Zalesskaya Zemlya) / Opolyans / Opolyan Krivichians, in Opolye Land or Opolye (Opolskaya Zemlya)  (later Rostov-Suzdal Principality or Vladimir-Suzdal Principality, that gradually evolved into the Grand Duchy of Moscow also called Muscovite Russia or Muscovite Rus') (this political entity is traditionally perceived as a cradle of the Great Russian language and Great Russian people, i.e. the Russians as a distinct Slavic people) (originally Moscow region was an enclave inhabited by a remnant of the Dniepr-Oka Baltic peoples, the Eastern Galindians or Goliad', which were conquered in the middle of 11th century by Rostov-Suzdal)
 Vyatichians (Vyatichi) also Oka Slavs, ancestors of Russians (Kievan Rus' Principalities roughly corresponded to older tribal lands)
 Kozelians / Kozelian Vyatichians, in Kozelsk Land (roughly in today's Kozelsk town and Kaluga and Tula regions, later part of the Chernigov Principality by conquest)
 Ryazanians / Ryazanian Vyatichians, in Ryazan' Land (later Ryazan Principality or Murom-Ryazan)
 Northwestern group (possible Northern Slavic group?) (they had a relevant part in the formation of Proto-Russians)
 Ilmen Slavs / Ilmen Slovenians (Slovene), also known as Novgorod Slovenes, Novgorod Slavs (Slovene), ancestors of Russians
 Bezhetians / Bezhetian Ilmen Slovenians (in Bezhetsk Land - Begetskaję Zemlę) (later part of the Novgorod Land - Novgorodskaję Zemlę, and the Novgorod Republic)
 Derevians / Derevian Ilmen Slovenians (in Dereva Land - Derevskaję Zemlę) (later part of the Novgorod Land - Novgorodskaję Zemlę, and the Novgorod Republic)
 Obonegians / Obonegian Ilmen Slovenians (in Obonego Land - Obonegskaję Zemlę) (later part of the Novgorod Land - Novgorodskaję Zemlę, and the Novgorod Republic)
 Shelonians / Shelonian Ilmen Slovenians (in Shelona Land - Shelonskaję Zemlę) (later part of the Novgorod Land - Novgorodskaję Zemlę, and the Novgorod Republic)

West Slavs

 Veneti / Wends? (common ancestors of West Slavs; some were also the ancestors of part of South Slavs and East Slavs)
 Czech–Moravian-Slovak group
 Bohemians (Čechové), tribal confederation, in Bohemia, Czech Republic. Ancestors of Czechs
 Berunzani (a Slavic Bohemian tribe, Chekhove, of West Bohemia)
 Chekhove proper / Čechové (Bohemian Slavs proper), also known as Pragani (Fraganeo), the tribe that lived in the Prague and Central Bohemian regions
 Děčané, in Děčín region, Czech Republic 
 Dudlebi (Doudlebi / Doudlebové) (Bohemian Dulebes), a group of Dulebes assimilated as a Slavic Bohemian or Czech tribe. (they lived in most of the southern half of Bohemia)
 Khébané (Chébané / Hbané)
 Khodove (Chodové) ("Walkers", "Patrollers" or "Rangers") (formed from recruited people originating in the  western Carpathian Mountains) (in Tuhošt' Land)
 Litoměřici or Lutomerizi, in the Czech lands from the sixth century (they lived in the Litoměřice region)
 Luchane / Luchani / Lutsane (Lučané)
 Lemuzi
 Lupiglai
 Pshovane (Pšované) / Besunzane (Bežunčani)
 Sedlichane (Sedličané / Sedlčané)
 Volynyane, a group of Volhynians (Volhynian Buzhans) assimilated as a Slavic Bohemian or Czech tribe.
 White Croats, Bohemian (they lived in most of the northeastern and eastern Bohemia - Čeche and they bordered White Serbs by the north)
 Zlicans (Zlitsans) / Zlichane (Zličané), in Bohemia (Czech). Ancestors of Czechs and possibly Poles.
 Moravians / Northern Merehani (Moravane), tribal confederation, in Záhorie (Slovakia) and Moravia. Ancestors of (modern) Moravians and part of the Slovaks. The Morava river of Moravia was in their lands. Ancestors of the South Moravians (Merehani), in Morava river valley, east Serbia, that migrated south of the Danube and were assimilated by South Slavs.
 Ganátsi / Hanátsi (Hanáci)
 Golasitsi / Holasitsi (Holasici)
 Gorátsi / Horátsi (Horáci)
 (Podyjští Moravané)
Slovaks* (more appropriately Sloveni for time period of this article), also called Nitran Slavs / Váh Slavs / Hungarian Slavs / Moravian Slovenes / Sloväni / Slověniny), tribal confederation, in Slovakia and northern parts of Hungary, possibly western Hungary as well. Ancestors of Slovaks, mayhaps were part of broader Slavic group sharing the same name (notice similarities with the south Slavic Slovenians). Sometimes referred to as Slovieni, although this word is generally incorrect, being a contracted term from 19th century. Note: While today the male member of Slovak nation is called Slovák, the original name for such person would be approx. Sloven. This is evident from the endonym of the country (Slovensko), and also the name for Slovak female (Slovenka) or language (slovenský jazyk). This change, purely linguistical, occurred starting in 14th century, applying the newer suffix -ák/-ak/-iak to the stem word Slov. This change most likely originated in neighbouring Bohemia, which is probably the reason why it never completely permeated Slovak language (compared to the Moravian region of Slovácko, so called Moravian Slovakia).
 Lechites (Lechitic group)
 Polish tribes
 Lendians, in east Lesser Poland and Red Ruthenia (Poland and Ukraine). Ancestors of Poles
 Masovians, tribal confederation, in Mazovia, Poland. Ancestors of Poles
 Polans (western), tribal confederation, in Greater Poland, Poland. Ancestors of Poles.
 Silesians / Silezane / Slezane, Silesia, tribal confederation, Poland. Ancestors of Poles and Silesian Germans
 Besunzane / Bezunchane (Bieżuńczanie)
 Bobryane (Bobrzanie)
 Dyedoshane (Dziadoszanie) / Dadosesani 
 Golensizi (Golęszyce), in Upper Silesia
 Lubushane (Lubuszanie)
 Lupiglaa (in today's Głubczyce region)
 Opolans / Opolini (Opolanie),  in Silesia 
 Silesians proper / Silezane proper / Slezane proper (Ślężanie)
 Tryebovane (Trzebowianie)
 Vistulans, in Lesser Poland, tribal confederation, Poland. Ancestors of Poles
 Pomeranians, tribal confederation, in Pomerania, Germany and Poland. Ancestors of Poles, Kashubians, and Slovincians
 Goplans, in Kuyavian-Pomeranian, Poland. Ancestors of Poles
 Kashubians, in Pomeranian Voivodeship, Poland
 Prissani / Pyritzans (Pyrzyczanie), in Pomerania, Poland. Ancestors of Poles
 Slovincians, a West Slavic tribe that lived between lakes Gardno and Łebsko near Słupsk in Pomerania.
 Wolinians / Uelunzani, on Wolin island, Pomerania, Poland. Ancestors of Poles
 Polabians (Wends)
 Veleti (Wilzi)  (Northern Polabians), in Mecklenburg-Vorpommern, Germany. 
 Lutici, tribal confederation, northeastern Germany. 
 Bethenici (Bethenzi or Bechelenzi)
 Doshane
 Four Core tribes (Lutici)
 Circipane, in Mecklenburg-Vorpommern, Germany. 
 Kessinians, in Mecklenburg-Vorpommern, Germany. 
 Redarians
 Tollensians, in Mecklenburg-Vorpommern, Germany.
 Hevelli (Havolane), in Brandenburg, Germany, by river Havel.
 Smeldingi
 Morizani / Morichane
 Rani / Rujani, on Rügen, Germany. 
 Sprevane, in Brandenburg, Germany, by river Spree.
 Stodorane (Lutici Stodorane)
 Ukrani, in Uckermark and Vorpommern-Greifswald, Germany.
 Obotrites / Reragi (Northern Polabians), tribal confederation, in Mecklenburg-Vorpommern, Germany. 
 Belesem / Byelozem = "White Earth" or "White Earth Tribe", they lived scattered in Oster Walde / Osterwalde - "Eastern Woods" in the Old Mainland Saxon view, west banks of the Elbe river
 Drevani = "Wood" or "Wood Tribe", they lived scattered in Oster Walde / Osterwalde - "Eastern Woods" in the Old Mainland Saxon view, west banks of the Elbe river) (Osterwalde and Luneburg Heath also matched the land where the Langobards lived for a time before migrating towards South) (mostly in today's Lower Saxony, in the Hanoverian Wendland, Germany)
 Linones, in the region around Lenzen.
 Lipani, tribe that lived scattered in the west banks of the Elbe river
 Obotrites proper / Northern Obotrites (Wismar Bay to Lake Schwerin).
 Polabians proper, in eastern Schleswig-Holstein, Germany.
 Travnjane east of the Trave.
 Wagri / Wagrians (the eastern Holstein as part of Saxony).
 Warnabi / Warnower,  in Mecklenburg (Germany), (the upper Warnow and Mildenitz).
 Polabian White Serbs / Boiki (Southern Polabians), in Saxony and Lower Lusatia, Germany. Ancestors of Sorbs, and part of the tribal groups that migrated towards southeast and south of the Danube are the ancestors of Serbs.
 Polabian Serbs (Elbe Serbs)
 Sorbs / Old Sorbs (Srbove), tribal confederation, roughly in Southern Brandenburg, East Saxony-Anhalt (east of the Saale river) and Upper Saxony, roughly in the east of the Middle Elbe river basin.
 Khutitsi
 Lusatians-Milceni
 Lusatians, in Lower Lusatia, Germany. Ancestors of Sorbs (Modern Sorbs) in Lower Lusatia.
 Milchane (Milčané) / Milceni / Milzeni, in Upper Lusatia, Germany, and in an area of far north Bohemia. Ancestors of Sorbs (Modern Sorbs) in Upper Lusatia.
 Moinwinidi
 Nishane
 Nizitsi
 Polabian Serbs proper (Sorbs Serbs or Srbi), they gave the name to the tribal confederation (Srbove).

South Slavs

The South Slavic tribes descend mainly from the Sclaveni that were the Slavs that lived south of the Danube river after Slavic migrations from the end of the 5th to 8th centuries, originally they came from the regions north of the Danube and migrated south spreading throughout east alpine slopes, west Pannonian Plain (west of the Danube), and the Balkans, they had more close ties with the Veneti, ancestors of the West Slavs (some west slavic and south slavic tribes have the same ancestors), than with the Antes, ancestors of the East Slavs. Over time, South Slavs, evolved into a new Slavic ethnolinguistic group, this phenomenon was accentuated by the Bavarian expansion towards east (part of the Ostsiedlung) and by the Magyar settlement and expansion in the Pannonian Plain (roughly today's Hungary), that severed the contiguous land or territory between West and South Slavs (in the Middle Danube river basin) and contact between both of them and contributed to a greater differentiation. They predate the medieval identities formed after the Great Schism.
 Sclaveni / Slavini (common ancestors of most of the South Slavs)
 West South Slavic group
 Bosnians, inhabited central parts of Bosnia, between the rivers of Upper Neretva on the south, Middle Bosna and the Krivaja (Bosna) on the north, Upper Drina on the east and Upper Vrbas on the west. Theories of them being descended from the Buzhans exist.
 Braničevci / Braniches, in eastern Serbia
 Carantanians / Carniolan Slavs / Old Slovenes / Southern Slovene (Sloventsi), tribal confederation, in Austria and Slovenia. Ancestors of Slovenes (particularly Carinthian Slovenes). They descend in part from Nitran Slavs (Northern Slovenes) that were also partial ancestors of modern Slovaks.
 Dudleipa (may have been a branch of the Dulebes)
 Duliebi (may have been a branch of the Dulebes)
 Stodorane (Caranthanian Stodorane)
 Susili
 Docleani / Diokletlians, in southern Montenegro (see also Tribes of Montenegro)
 Guduscani, in Lika, Croatia
 Kanalites, in southern Dalmatia
 Merehani / Southern Merehani / Southern Moravians (Moravci / Moravtsi), in (South) Morava river, eastern Serbia. They descend from Moravian / Merehani tribal groups that migrated south of the Danube and over time differenciate themselves and were assimilated into South Slavs.
 Narentines / Neretvians, in southern Dalmatia
 Pannonian Slavs, in west Pannonian Plain, west of the Danube river, roughly in today's west Hungary. They were assimilated by Magyars after they settled in Hungary.
 Pannonian Dulebes
 Sava Slavs, roughly in the plain between the Sava and Mura rivers. Ancestors of part of Croats.  
 Praedenecenti / Eastern Abodriti / Eastern Obotrites, in Banat. They descend from Abodriti / Obotrites tribal groups that migrated south of the Danube and over time differenciate themselves and were assimilated into South Slavs.
 Timočani, in eastern Serbia
 Travunians / Terbunians, in Herzegovina and western Montenegro
 White Croats, in Western Ukraine, Lesser Poland and Bohemia, ancestors of Croats
 Croats
 White Serbs / Sorbs, in Lower Lusatia, Germany. Ancestors of Sorbs and Serbs
 Serbs
 Zachumliani / Zachlumians, in southern Dalmatia
 East South Slavic group
 Berziti / Bersites, in Ohrid, North Macedonia
 Drougoubitai / Draguvites, in Southern Bulgaria, North Macedonia and Greek Macedonia
 Keramisians, in North Macedonia and Greek Macedonia.
 Marvaci / Marvatsi, in Rhodopes, southern Bulgaria and northern Greece
 Milcovci / Miltsovtsi
 Seven Slavic tribes (or Seven Slavic Clans) (Heptaradici / Eptaradici - "Seven Roots"?), tribal confederation, in northern Bulgaria and Southern Romania that formed the basis of the Slavic Bulgarians (after later being conquered by the Turkic origin Bulgars that formed much of the Aristocracy and led to the name change of the people and language)
 Unknown tribes (unknown names)
 Severians, in Dobrudja,  / Severes / Severi (Balkan Severians), northeast Bulgaria and Southeastern Romania, the Severians were an East Slavic tribe, part of the tribal groups that migrated southward and southwestward and formed a union with the Seven Slavic tribes (to form the Slavic Bulgarians) and over time differenciate themselves and were assimilated into South Slavs.
 Sklavenoi / Sclaveni Proper (Slavic tribes of Greece, including Greek Macedonia)
 Baiounitai / Bainuites / Vajunites, originally in Macedonia, later in Epirus (Vagenetia)
 Belegezites / Velegezites, in Thessaly
 Ezerites / Erezitai, in the Peloponnese
 Melingoi, in the Peloponnese
 Rynchines / Rhynchinoi, also Recchines, in Greek Macedonia (Southern Macedonia), Northern Chalkidiki and southern slopes of the Rhodopes.
 Sagudates, in southern Greek Macedonia
 Smolyani, in the Rhodopes, southern Bulgaria and northern Greece
 Strymonites, near the Struma river, southern Bulgaria and northern Greece

Unclassified Slavs
 Sittici / Zhytychi / Zuireani?
 Zerivani / Zeriuani / Zeruiani (same as the Chervyani? Severians? Drevlians? Unlikely, Chervyani, Severians and Drevlians can not be the same tribe, because in Slavic languages: Chervyani - red ones (Red Croats), Severians - northern ones, Drevlians - wood people)
 Znetalici

Possible Slavs

Unclassified
 Miloxi
 Uerizane / Verizane

Slavs or Balts
Neuri / Navari (a people mentioned by Herodotus)

Slavs, Balts or Finnic
 Budini
 Vends (Livonia)

Slavs or Romance peoples
 Bolokhovians / Bolokhoveni / Bolokhovens (East Slavic tribe or Valachians? the similar name to Valachians could have been only coincidental)

Slavs or Turkics
 Sebbirozi / Zabirozi / Zabrozi / Sabirs (possibly Turkic)

Unclassified peoples or tribes
Mentioned by Bavarian Geographer and possibly Baltic Indo-European
 Thafnezi / Athfenzi / (Y)athfengi? (possibly Yatvingians)
Mentioned by Bavarian Geographer and possibly Iranian Indo-European
 Lucolane / Lucolani (possibly Alan Sarmatian Iranians)
 Serauici / Seravici (possibly Alan Sarmatian Iranians)

Mentioned by Bavarian Geographer and possibly Turkic
 Attorozi (possibly Turkic)
 Aturezani (possibly Turkic)
 Chozirozi / Caziri (possibly the Khazars)
 Uuilerozi / Vilerozi / Bilerozi (possibly Turkic)

Mentioned by Bavarian Geographer and possibly Uralic
 Neriuani / Nerivani / Merivani (possibly Uralic, the Merya?)

Mentioned by Bavarian Geographer and Unknown
 Thadesi

See also
Slavic peoples
Slavic languages
Ethnic group
Tribe
 Outline of Slavic history and culture

Sources 
 Adams,  Douglas Q. (1997). Encyclopedia of Indo-European Culture. London: Fitzroy Dearborn Publishers. 
 Barford, Paul M (2001), The Early Slavs: Culture and Society in Early Medieval Eastern Europe, Cornell University Press, 
 Gimbutas, Marija Alseikaitė (1971), The Slavs, Thames and Hudson, 
 Koncha, S. (2012). Bavarian Geographer On Slavic Tribes From Ukraine. http://ukrbulletin.univ.kiev.ua/Visnyk-16-en/Koncha.pdf Ukrainian Studies. 12. Bulletin of Taras Shevchenko National University of Kyiv. pp. 15–21.

References

External links
 First Slavic Tribes www.youtube.com

Ancient Slavs
Ancient Slavs

Lists of ancient Indo-European peoples and tribes
Slavic
Slavic